Blakenham may refer to:

People
Viscount Blakenham, peerage in the United Kingdom

Places
Great Blakenham, Suffolk, England
Little Blakenham, Suffolk, England